Lars Rehmann (born 21 May 1975) is a former professional tennis player from Germany.

Career
Rehmann was a successful junior player, winning the Boys' Doubles at the 1993 Australian Open, with countryman Christian Tambue. They defeated the American pairing of Scott Humphries and Jimmy Jackson 6–7, 7–5, 6–2. In the same year he was also the junior single and doubles champion at Germany's national championship and also reached the final of the doubles at the 1993 Ansett Australian Indoor Championships. Along the way he and partner Alexander Mronz were victorious over top seeds Todd Woodbridge and Mark Woodforde.

In 1994, he partnered Australian Joshua Eagle at the Wimbledon Championships but they lost in the opening round to number six seeds Tom Nijssen and Cyril Suk. He also reached his first ATP final that year, at Zaragoza where he lost to Magnus Larsson.

The following year he competed in the singles of the 1995 Australian Open, the only other Grand Slam that he got to compete in. He defeated Luiz Mattar of Brazil 6–3, 6–4, 6–1 and make it into the second round, but then lost to eventual quarter finalist Andriy Medvedev 5–7, 4–6, 1–6. In Seoul he reached another ATP final but was defeated again, this time to Greg Rusedski.

He is married to former WTA player Melanie Schnell.

Junior Grand Slam finals

Doubles: 1 (1 title)

ATP career finals

Singles: 2 (2 runners-up)

Doubles: 1 (1 runner-up)

ATP Challenger and ITF Futures finals

Singles: 2 (1–1)

Doubles: 6 (1–5)

Performance timeline

Singles

References

1975 births
Living people
German male tennis players
Australian Open (tennis) junior champions
Sportspeople from Leverkusen
Grand Slam (tennis) champions in boys' doubles
Tennis people from North Rhine-Westphalia